Lokenath Debnath (September 30, 1935 – March 2, 2023) was an Indian-American mathematician.

Biography
Debnath was born on September 30, 1935 in India. He received both Masters and a doctorate degree from University of Calcutta in Pure Mathematics in 1965. He obtained a Ph.D. in Applied Mathematics at University of London in 1967. His doctoral advisor was Simon Rosenblat. He was a professor of mathematics at University of Texas Rio Grande Valley. He was a professor at University of Central Florida from 1983 to 2001.

Debnath was a founder of the mathematical journal International Journal of Mathematics and Mathematical Sciences. He died on March 2, 2023, at the age of 87.

Publications

Books

References 

1935 births
2023 deaths
British mathematicians
Fluid dynamicists
Indian fluid dynamicists
Indian emigrants to the United States
University of Central Florida faculty